Malic can refer to:

 Malíč, village in the Czech Republic.
 Malič, mountain in Serbia
 Malic acid, an organic compound
 Gruban Malić, a fictional character
 Nedeljko Malić, Bosnian footballer